Adelkino is a rural locality (a selo) in Yermolkinsky Selsoviet, Belebeyevsky District, Bashkortostan, Russia. The population was 304 as of 2010. There are 5 streets.

Geography 
Adelkino is located 16 km northwest of Belebey (the district's administrative centre) by road. Yermolkino is the nearest rural locality.

References 

Rural localities in Belebeyevsky District